Alsatian cuisine, the cuisine of the Alsace region of France, incorporates Germanic culinary traditions and is marked by the use of pork in various forms. The region is also known for its wine and beer.

Alsatian food is synonymous with conviviality, the dishes are substantial and served in generous portions and it has one of the richest regional kitchens.

Food

Savory specialties 
Traditional dishes include baeckeoffe, flammekueche, choucroute, cordon bleu, Vol-au-vent, spaetzle, fleischnacka and bretzel. The region's version of coq au vin is coq au Riesling. Southern Alsace, also called the Sundgau, is characterized by carpe frite (that also exists in Yiddish tradition). Alsace is also well known for its foie gras made in the region since the 17th century.

The gastronomic symbol of the région is undoubtedly the Choucroute, a local variety of Sauerkraut. The word Sauerkraut in Alsatian has the form sûrkrût, same as in other southwestern German dialects, and means "sour cabbage" as its Standard German equivalent. This word was included into the French language as choucroute. To make it, the cabbage is finely shredded, layered with salt and juniper and left to ferment in wooden barrels. Sauerkraut can be served with poultry, pork, sausage or even fish. Traditionally it is served with pork, Strasbourg sausage or frankfurters, bacon, smoked pork or smoked Morteau or Montbéliard sausages or a selection of pork products. Served alongside are often steamed potatoes.

The second most famous dish is the baeckeoffe, a dish made from potatoes, vegetables, as well as three different meat (pork, lamb and beef). Everything is cooked together in the oven in a terrine with Alsace white wine and herbs during several hours.

The flammekueche (tarte flambée) is also very popular in Alsace. It is sometimes called the Alsatian pizza but its dough is much thinner. It is traditionally filled with a mixture of crème fraîche and fromage blanc, bacon strips and onions.

Additionally, Alsace is known for its fruit juices, mineral waters and wines.

Sweet specialties 
Sweet specialties of Alsace include kougelhopf, german-style cheesecake (called fromage blanc tart), Mont-Blanc (called torche aux marrons in Alsace) and streusel.

The festivities of the year's end involve the production of a great variety of biscuits and small cakes called bredala, as well as pain d'épices (gingerbread) which are baked around Christmas time and manala (a brioche in the shape of a little guy) which are traditionally baked for Saint Nicholas Day (on the 6th of December).

Wine

Alsace is an important wine-producing région. Alsace wines are mostly white and display a strong Germanic influence. Alsace produces some of the world's most noted dry rieslings and is the only région in France to produce mostly varietal wines, typically from grapes also used in Germany. The most notable example is Gewürztraminer.

Alsace wines are made from seven different grape varieties: Sylvaner, Pinot Blanc, Riesling, Muscat, Pinot Gris, Gewürztraminer and Pinot Noir. Pinot Noir is the only Alsatian red wine.

The region also produces Crémant d'Alsace, a sparkling wine.

Beer
Alsace is also the main beer-producing région of France, thanks primarily to breweries in and near Strasbourg. These include those of Fischer, Karlsbräu, Kronenbourg, and Heineken International, but also a lot of micro-breweries. Hops are grown in Kochersberg and in northern Alsace.

Schnapps 
Schnapps is also traditionally made in Alsace, but it is in decline because home distillers are becoming less common and the consumption of traditional, strong, alcoholic beverages is decreasing.

References